Abraliopsis tui is a species of enoploteuthid cephalopod found in the waters around New Zealand and the Kermadec Islands.

References

Abraliopsis
Molluscs described in 1985